Digital Theatre is a company that provides digital platforms for the arts. Founded by Robert Delamere and Tom Shaw and launched in London in 2009, the company produces and licenses high-definition films of stage productions that can be streamed on demand for both consumer and educational purposes.

In 2011, Digital Theatre's flagship digital educational platform Digital Theatre+ was launched, providing institutions around the world with access to productions and educational resources to support the teaching of English and Drama.

Digital Theatre was acquired by ScaleUp Capital (formerly Root Capital LLP) in 2015. In 2019, former head of BBC iPlayer and BBC Sounds Neelay Patel was appointed CEO.

Partners 
Digital Theatre partners with a number of major theatre companies to produce and license productions for the platform. Partners include Sonia Friedman Productions, Almeida Theatre, Donmar Warehouse, Royal Opera House, English Touring Theatre, Eclipse, Royal Shakespeare Company, The Old Vic and Frantic Assembly.

Original productions 
As well as licensing productions from partner companies, Digital Theatre also produces original live captures of stage productions in the UK.

Awards and nominations

References

External links

English theatre managers and producers